Mindrolling Jetsün Khandro Rinpoche (birth name Tsering Paldrön; born August 19, 1967) is a lama in Tibetan Buddhism. Born in Kalimpong, India and the daughter of the late Mindrolling Trichen, Khandro Rinpoche was recognized by Rangjung Rigpe Dorje, 16th Karmapa at the age of two as the reincarnation of the Great Dakini of Tsurphu Monastery, Urgyen Tsomo, who was one of the most well-known female masters of her time. Khandro Urgyen Tsomo was the consort to Khakyab Dorje, 15th Karmapa Lama (1871–1922) and recognised in this Buddhist tradition as an incarnation of Yeshe Tsogyal. Her name is in fact her title, Khandro being Tibetan for dakini and rinpoche an honorific usually reserved for tulkus that means "precious one."

Upbringing, training and role
Mindrolling Jetsün Khandro Rinpoche is a teacher in both the Kagyu and Nyingma schools.  She speaks fluent English, Standard Tibetan, and Hindi and has completed a Western education at St. Joseph's Convent, Wynberg Allen School, Mussoorie, and St. Mary's Convent, both in India. She has taught in Europe, North America and Southeast Asia since 1987. She has established and heads the Samten Tse Retreat Center  in Mussoorie, India, and she is also resident teacher at Lotus Garden Retreat Center in Virginia, USA. She is also actively involved with the administration of the Mindrolling Monastery in Dehradun, India. Additionally, she is interested in interfaith dialogue and currently sits on the Board of World Religious Leaders for the Elijah Interfaith Institute.

According to Judith Simmer-Brown:

See also
Urgyen Tsomo

References

Bibliography
This Precious Life: Tibetan Buddhist Teachings on the Path to Enlightenment, Shambhala Publications (2003),

Other Texts online
Compassion and Wisdom by Venerable Khandro Rinpoche
Living the Dharma by Khandro Rinpoche

External links

Official website for Her Eminence Mindrolling Jetsün Khandro Rinpoche
 History Female Masters Within the Mindrolling Tradition
The History of Mindrolling
BBC interview
YouTube interview with Khandro Rinpoche (Flash video)
Official website for Study Groups in Spain

1967 births
Living people
Women Buddhist clergy
Kagyu lamas
Nyingma lamas
People from Kalimpong district
Tulkus
Tibetan Buddhists from India
Tibetan women
Indian Buddhists